Xian Yi Fang (born 20 August 1977) is a female Chinese-born table tennis player who has represented France since 2005.

She competed at the 2008 Summer Olympics, reaching the second round of the singles competition.  She also competed at the 2012 Summer Olympics and reaching the third round of the singles competition.

She was born in Baoding.

References

2008 Olympic profile
Profil on Facebook

1977 births
Chinese emigrants to France
French female table tennis players
Living people
Olympic table tennis players of France
Table tennis players at the 2008 Summer Olympics
Table tennis players at the 2012 Summer Olympics
European Games competitors for France
Table tennis players at the 2015 European Games
Mediterranean Games silver medalists for France
Competitors at the 2013 Mediterranean Games
Table tennis players from Baoding
Naturalised table tennis players
Naturalized citizens of France
People who lost Chinese citizenship
Mediterranean Games medalists in table tennis